Jorge Raúl Carcagno (28 October 1922 – 22 January 1983) was an Argentine general. He served as commander-in-chief of the Argentine Army and de facto Federal Interventor of Córdoba, Argentina from June 16, 1969 to July 5, 1969, shortly after the period of civil unrest known as the Cordobazo.

Carcagno was appointed to govern Córdoba by the military government of General Juan Carlos Onganía. He continued as a senior military figure and in the first democratic government of Héctor Cámpora in 1973 he served as commander-in-chief of the Army, being replaced later that year by President Juan Perón. In those months, Carcagno had initiated the 'Dorrego Operation', which sought to build bridges between the state and the politicised and militant youth movements.

References

1922 births
1983 deaths
Argentine generals
Governors of Córdoba Province, Argentina